Seka is situated in the tambon (subdistrict) of Seka District, in Bueng Kan Province, Thailand. In 2020 it had a total population of 19,001 people.

Geography
It is the seat of the district. It lies in the southeastern part of the province, near the border with Sakon Nakhon Province. It lies along Thailand Route 2026.

Administration

Central administration
The tambon is subdivided into 23 administrative villages (muban).

Local administration
The area of the subdistrict is shared by 2 local governments.
the subdistrict municipality (Thesaban Tambon) Si Phana (เทศบาลตำบลศรีพนา)
the subdistrict administrative organization (SAO) Seka (องค์การบริหารส่วนตำบลเซกา)

References

External links
Thaitambon.com on Seka

Tambon of Bueng Kan province
Populated places in Bueng Kan province